Kevin Peter Turnquest (born August 22, 1964) is a Bahamian politician who served as Deputy Prime Minister and Minister of Finance from May 15, 2017 to November 25, 2020.  He is a Certified Public accountant. He was the deputy leader of the Free National Movement. He earned his Bachelor of Business Administration from Prairie View A&M University and his Master of Business Administration from Nova Southeastern University.

References

1964 births
Living people
Deputy Prime Ministers of the Bahamas
Finance ministers of the Bahamas
Free National Movement politicians
Prairie View A&M University alumni
Nova Southeastern University alumni
21st-century Bahamian politicians